Rhagovelia obesa is a species of smaller water striders in the family Veliidae. It is found in North America.

References

 Polhemus, Dan A. (1997). "Systematics of the Genus Rhagovelia Mayr (Heteroptera: Veliidae) in the Western Hemisphere (Exclusive of the angustipes Complex)". Thomas Say Publications in Entomology: Monographs, ii + 386.
 Thomas J. Henry, Richard C. Froeschner. (1988). Catalog of the Heteroptera, True Bugs of Canada and the Continental United States. Brill Academic Publishers.

Further reading

 Arnett, Ross H. (2000). American Insects: A Handbook of the Insects of America North of Mexico. CRC Press.

External links

 NCBI Taxonomy Browser, Rhagovelia obesa

Veliidae
Insects described in 1871